The Hardbop Grandpop is an album by jazz pianist Horace Silver released on the Impulse! label in 1996 featuring performances by Silver with Claudio Roditi, Steve Turre, Michael Brecker, Ronnie Cuber, Ron Carter, and Lewis Nash. The Allmusic review by Scott Yanow awarded the album 4½ stars and calls the album "One of Horace Silver's finest recordings in his post-Blue Note era".

Track listing
All compositions by Horace Silver
 "I Want You" - 5:15  
 "The Hippest Cat in Hollywood" - 6:43  
 "Gratitude" - 5:38  
 "Hawkin'" - 6:17  
 "I Got the Blues in Santa Cruz" - 8:05  
 "We've Got Silver at Six" - 7:05  
 "The Hardbop Grandpop" - 5:20  
 "The Lady from Johannesburg" - 6:02  
 "Serenade to a Teakettle" - 6:24  
 "Diggin' on Dexter" - 5:40 
Recorded in NYC on February 29-March 1, 1996.

Personnel
Horace Silver - piano
Claudio Roditi - trumpet, flugelhorn
Steve Turre - trombone
Michael Brecker - tenor saxophone
Ronnie Cuber - baritone saxophone 
Ron Carter - bass
Lewis Nash - drums

References

Horace Silver albums
1996 albums
Impulse! Records albums